Anopheles (Cellia) tessellatus is a species complex of zoophilic mosquito belonging to the genus Anopheles. It is found in India, and Sri Lanka, Bangladesh, Cambodia, China, Indonesia, Malaysia, Laos, Maldives, Myanmar, Nepal, Philippines, Taiwan, Thailand and Vietnam. It is first described from Sri Lanka (then Ceylon). Larvae are known to found from dirty stagnant water in sun or shady habitats. Adults are zoophilic. It is not regarded as a malaria vector, but is a secondary vector of Wuchereria bancrofti in Maldives.

References

External links
Infectivity of Plasmodium vivax and P. falciparum to Anopheles tessellatus; relationship between oocyst and sporozoite development.
The resting sites and blood-meal sources of Anopheles minimus in Taiwan
The Salivary Gland Chromosomes of Anopheles tessellatus
Studies on Anopheles tessellatus Plasmodium falciparum interactions
Anopheles tessellatus midgut glycoproteins and the midguts of other vector mosquitoes
Fecundity of Anopheles tessellatus reduced by the ingestion of murine anti-mosquito antibodies
Host Immunity to Mosquitoes: Effect of Antimosquito Antibodies on Anopheles tessellatus and Culex quinquefasciatus (Diptera: Culicidae)
Physiological aspects of multiple blood feeding in the malaria vector
Western blot of Anopheles tessellatus adult and larval

tessellatus
Insects described in 1901